The eastern bronze-naped pigeon (Columba delegorguei) is a species of bird in the family Columbidae. It is found in Angola, Kenya, Malawi, Mozambique, South Africa, South Sudan, Tanzania, Uganda, Zambia, and Zimbabwe. It is part of the Turturoena subgenus. The species is named after the collector, Adulphe Delegorgue.

References

External links
 (Delgorgue's pigeon = ) eastern bronze-naped pigeon - Species text in The Atlas of Southern African Birds.
 Eastern Bronze-naped Pigeon in South Africa - Birds in Reserves Project

eastern bronze-naped pigeon
Birds of East Africa
eastern bronze-naped pigeon
Taxonomy articles created by Polbot